Robert Lloyd-Taylor (born 1 September 1980) is an English welterweight boxer.

External links

1980 births
Living people
English male boxers
People from Ealing
Welterweight boxers
Boxers from Greater London